Tunka Suka (Aymara tunka ten, suka furrow, "ten furrows", hispanicized spelling Tunga Suca) is a mountain in the Andes of Peru, about  high. It is located in the Cusco Region, Canas Province, Tupac Amaru District. Tunka Suka lies west of a town of that name (Tungasuca) and southwest of the large lake named Tunka Suka Quta in Aymara.

References 

Mountains of Peru
Mountains of Cusco Region